EP7 is a 1999 album by Autechre

EP7 may also refer to:
 PKP class EP07, a locomotive